Kamloops was a federal electoral district in British Columbia, Canada, that was represented in the House of Commons of Canada from 1935 to 1968, and from 1988 to 2004. From 1998 to 2004, it was known as Kamloops, Thompson and Highland Valleys.

History
This riding was created in 1935 from parts of Cariboo and Kootenay West ridings. It was abolished in 1966 when it was redistributed into Coast Chilcotin, Fraser Valley East, Kamloops—Cariboo, Okanagan—Kootenay and Prince George—Peace River ridings.

In 1987, a new Kamloops riding was created from parts of Kamloops—Shuswap riding. In 1998, it was renamed "Kamloops, Thompson and Highland Valleys".

It consisted of:
 Electoral Areas A, B, J, L, O and P of the Thompson-Nicola Regional District;
 The City of Kamloops;
 the Village of Chase; and
 the District Municipality of Logan Lake.

It was redefined in 1996 to consist of:
 Subdivisions A, B and E  of Thompson-Nicola Regional District, including Skeetchestn Indian Reserve and Logan Lake District Municipality, excepting Spatsum Indian Reserve No. 11;
 the City of Kamloops; and
 Kamloops Indian Reserve No. 1.

In 2003, the riding was abolished, and a new riding, "Kamloops—Thompson", was created with substantially the same boundaries. In 2005, this district was renamed "Kamloops—Thompson—Cariboo".

Members of Parliament 

This riding elected the following Members of Parliament:

Election results

Kamloops, Thompson and Highland Valleys, 1998–2003

Kamloops, 1987–1998

Kamloops, 1933–1966

See also 

 List of Canadian federal electoral districts
 Past Canadian electoral districts

External links 
Expenditures - 2000
Expenditures – 1997

Riding history from the Library of Parliament:
Kamloops (1933 - 1966)
Kamloops (1987 - 1998)
 Kamloops,Thompson and Highland Valleys (1998 - 2003)

Former federal electoral districts of British Columbia
Kamloops